Socio-Economic Planning Sciences (full title: Socio-Economic Planning Sciences: The International Journal of Public Sector Decision-Making) is a bi-monthly peer-reviewed scientific journal covering socio-economics as it relates to development economics and public policy. It was established in 1967 and is published by Elsevier. The editor-in-chief is Rajan Batta (University at Buffalo). According to the Journal Citation Reports, the journal has a 2021 impact factor of 4.923.

References

External links

Socioeconomics
Policy analysis journals
Development economics
Publications established in 1967
Quarterly journals
Elsevier academic journals
English-language journals